Rupi's Dance (2003) is the fourth studio album by Jethro Tull frontman
Ian Anderson. The album was released around the same time
as Jethro Tull guitarist Martin Barre's new solo album, Stage Left, and preceded Jethro Tull's album, The Jethro Tull Christmas Album. 

The final bonus track of Rupi's Dance, "Birthday Card at Christmas", is also the opening track to The Jethro Tull Christmas Album.

Track listing
 "Calliandra Shade (The Cappuccino Song)" – 5:02
 "Rupi's Dance" – 3:00
 "Lost in Crowds" – 5:37
 "A Raft of Penguins" – 3:34
 "A Week of Moments" – 4:27
 "A Hand of Thumbs" – 4:02
 "Eurology" – 3:14
 "Old Black Cat" – 3:40
 "Photo Shop" – 3:20
 "Pigeon Flying over Berlin Zoo" – 4:18 
 "Griminelli's Lament" – 2:56
 "Not Ralitsa Vassileva" – 4:45
 "Two Short Planks" – 4:00
 "Birthday Card at Christmas" – 3:37 (bonus track)

Personnel 
 Ian Anderson – vocals, acoustic guitar, bamboo flute, accordion, bass, percussion
 Ossi Schaller – guitar
 George Kopecsni – guitar
 Laszlo Bencker – piano, Hammond B-3 organ, mellotron, keyboards
 John O'Hara – accordion, keyboards
 Andrew Giddings – keyboards, bass
 David Goodier – stand-up bass, bass guitar
 Leslie Mandoki – drums, percussion
 James Duncan – drums
 The Sturcz String Quartet

Guests:
 Doane Perry – drums on bonus track
 Martin Barre – electric guitar on bonus track

External links
 

Ian Anderson albums
2003 albums
Albums produced by Ian Anderson